As-Saffat (Those who rank themselves in Order, "Ranged in Row", "The Rangers") is the 37th chapter (sūrah) of the Qur'an with 182 verses (āyāt).

Regarding the timing and contextual background of the  believed revelation  (asbāb al-nuzūl), it is an earlier "Meccan surah", which means it is believed to have been revealed in Mecca, rather than later in Medina.

Summary

1-5 The Prophet swears that God is one
6-10  The devils not permitted to hear the discourse of heaven
11-12  The audacity of the Makkan infidels
13-15  They scoff at the Quran as the product of sorcery
16-17  They reject the doctrine of the resurrection
18-21  The despair of the infidels on the judgment-day
22-24  Idolaters and their idols and gods to be called to account
25-29  They will dispute among themselves and reproach one another
30-33 They shall all be punished in hell
34-35  Makkan idolaters call their Prophet “a distracted poet”
36-38  Muhammad protests his prophetic character and threatens the infidels
39-47  Reward of believers in Paradise
48-53  Believers shall look down from heaven upon their infidel acquaintance in hell
54-55  The righteous attribute their salvation to the grace of God
56-59  They rejoice in life eternal
60-62  The tree at Zaqqúm described
63-66  The awful portion of the damned
67-72  Makkan infidels follow in the footsteps of their fathers
The story of Noah 73 Noah calls on God in his distress 74  He and his family are delivered 75-79  His name to be revered by posterity 80  The unbelievers are drowned
 The story of Abraham 81, 82 Abraham a follower of Noah's religion 83-85 He reproaches his father and neighbours for their idolatry 86-88 He excuses himself from attending the idolatrous rites of his townsmen 90-91 He first mocks the idols and then breaks them in pieces 95-96 God delivers him from the fire 97-107 God tries the faith of Abraham 108-111 His name to be revered by posterity 112-113 He receives Isaac by promise, who is blessed with him
The story of Moses and Aaron 114-115 God delivers them and their people from great distress 116 They conquer the Egyptians 117-118 God gives them the Book of the Law (Fourth) 119-122 Their names to be revered by posterity
The story of Elias 123 He is sent a prophet to his people 124-126 He preaches against idolatry 127 They accuse him of imposture 128 The infidels to be punished 129-132 His name to be revered by posterity
The story of Lot 133-135 God delivers him and his family, except his wife 136 The rest of his people are destroyed 137-138 The Makkan infidels warned by the example of the Sodomites
 The story of Jonas 139-140 He is sent as a prophet and flees to a ship 141-144 He is swallowed by a fish for his sin 145-146 He is cast on the shore and shaded by a gourd 147-148 He is sent to a multitude who believe
149-160  The Makkans are rebuked for attributing offspring to God
161-163  The reprobate only will be seduced by idolatry
164-166 Muslims worship God, arranging themselves in ranks
167-170 Infidels excuse their unbelief in vain
171-173 Former apostles were assisted against the infidels
174-179 The Prophet exhorted to await divine vengeance on unbelievers
180-182 Praise be to God and peace on his apostles

Chronology
According to Egyptian chronology, it was the 56th sura to be revealed to Muhammad. Theodor Nöldeke presents a different classification putting it in the 50th position and most precisely revealed in the second Meccan period (see Meccan sura). That period is marked by increasing opposition of the Quraysh tribe against Muhammad and his followers and is distinguished by its focus on divine intervention and inspiration and also previous religious prophets. Although named Al-Saffat, the general theme of Sura 37 is the unity of God and His power to greatly reward and punish. We see in this Sura elaborations on the punishment of disbelievers and rewards of believers in the Day of Judgment but also God's examples of how a true believer should be through enumerations of biblical figures. One aspect of the Sura which can be relevant to the title (Ranged in Row, the rangers) is that it is threatening the people who attribute offspring to God, especially the pagans who believed that the angels were the daughters of God. “The rangers” or “Ranged in Row” refers to the angel who will be lining up on the Day of Judgment and refuting the idea of them being daughters of God (see Quran 37:1-5).

Parts of Q37:15-33; 43–68; 82–103;& 118-144 are preserved in the Ṣan‘ā’1 lower text.

Structure and content 
Sura 37 could be divided into three parts following one characteristic of Arabic Poetry widely known as tripartite division. The first part goes from verses 1 to 74, the second part from 75 to 148 and the last part from 149 to 182.

37:1-74 Eschatological prophecy 
The first part goes from verse 1 to 74 with eschatological prophecy as central theme but could be divided into two sub-parts: 1-10 and 11–74.

From verse 1 to 10, we have a snapshot of the setting of the Day of Judgment. From this description, you see that there will be angels ranged in row claiming the unity of God (37:1-6), a higher assembly quite exclusive (37:7-8) and disbelievers who will be driven away for their perpetual torment (37:9-10). This same setting is consistent with the one described in Sura 78:38 in the early Meccan period: “On the day when the spirit and the angels stand in rows, they will not speak except for those to whom the Lord of Mercy gives permission, and who will say only what is right”. However comparing this two verses, we see that the last one (37:1-6) has more details than the previous one (78:38). It almost seems that the latter is a continuation of the former. We can infer, from the combination of the two verses, that the angels ranged in row will vehemently refute what the pagans were putting forward about them (the angels) being the daughters of God (see Arabian mythology) and will claim the unity of God under his permission.

From 11 to 74, the verses reveal the description of the Day of Judgment including a depiction of its dynamic in its smallest details. At the beginning of this sub-part (11 to 39), we are exposed to a debate between the Prophet and the angels on one side, and the disbelievers on the other side. Debates are mainly characteristics of middle Meccan suras. In this particular section, one could sense a two-way discussion between both parties, putting more stress on the feelings of one party: the disbelievers. This section starts with how the disbelievers use to refute the message of God and continue with how their attitude will change when they will be faced with the truth of the Day of Judgment. The Sura portrays their surprise, their regrets for not believing in the word of God and makes it seem that it will be too late for them to be saved because in the Day of Judgment, no one can save no one, your deeds could no longer be changed. In addition, this section puts the Prophet in an intermediate position where he is made to transmit God's answers to them on that specific day: “Say, yes indeed, and you will be humiliated” (37:18). 
Finally, throughout verses 11 to 74 we see an interesting juxtaposition structure which is very visible. The attitudes and experiences of people whose actions were good on earth and those whose actions were bad are explored back to back to make the contrast more visible but also to provide a picture of the scenery in the Day of Judgment with the two sides sitting not far away from each other. From verse 11 to 39, we have a description of the experience of the disbelievers on the D-day and follows, from verse 40 to 57, a contrasting experience of the believers where they comment on the fate of the disbelievers and how lucky they were not to be in their place: “By God, you almost brought me to ruin! Had it not been for the grace of my Lord, I too would have been taken to hell” (37:56). Finally we see again from verses 58 to 74 another description of the disbelievers’ experience. One specific detail that will be interesting to look at in this last part is the mention of a specific tree in verses 62 to 69: the tree of Zaqqum whose fruits will be forced to people in hell to intensify their torment. In Asbab al-nuzul, this tree is believed to be used to threaten the unbelievers among the Quraysh tribe.

37:75-148 Earlier messengers of God 
In the early Meccan suras, there was not any mention of the earlier messengers of God as present in the Bible but in the middle Meccan suras they are gradually brought in to translate their actions into great rewards in the Afterlife and therefore give good references to the common believers and unbelievers. This section particularly tackles some biblical figures with a snapshot of specific actions they took that translated into great rewards. It starts with Noah with a snapshot of the Noah's Ark story in the Bible, putting a stress on how God helped him to save his people because he was a true believer. We also have a mention of the story of Jonah, Yunus, describing his fall in the ocean and how God saved him by making him be swallowed by a big fish.  We therefore see a slightly different approach of the Quran from the Bible based on where the emphasis is put on in counting that story. We also see snapshots of stories about Abraham, Moses, Aaron, Elijah and Lot included in this section to serve the same purpose: stressing out God's rewards to his true servants (37:121) instead of limiting oneself in counting these stories as they occurred, as the Bible does.

149-182 Day of Judgment

In this last section, we are taken back into the Day of Judgment where the Quran is addressing the disbelievers one more time but differently. Here it is no longer a debate but one way speech. We see a succession of rhetorical question about certain claims the disbelievers are making that God, through Muhammad, is asking. He then develops into saying that those claims are all false and the disbelievers will know when the Day of Judgment comes. This section closes with a few praises to God making a ring structure which is very noticeable. Indeed, as mentioned in the beginning, the angels were ranged in row praising God and we see here from 164 to 166 the same scenario and then from 180 to 182 we read again praises to God. The Sura therefore goes from one point and comes back to the same point at the end, making a ring.

References

External links 
Q37:20, 50+ translations, islamawakened.com
Quran 37 Clear Quran translation

 Chronology of the Qura'n

Saaffat
Abraham in Islam